The 1994 Albany Firebirds season was the fifth season for the Albany Firebirds. They finished the 1994 season 10–2 and lost in the semifinals of the AFL playoffs to the Arizona Rattlers.

Regular season

Schedule

Standings

Playoffs
The Firebirds were seeded second overall in the AFL playoffs.

Awards

References

Indiana Firebirds seasons
1994 Arena Football League season
Albany Firebirds Season, 1994